The title of Marquess of Hamilton has been created twice in British history.

For the creation of 1599, see Duke of Hamilton
For the creation of 1868, see Duke of Abercorn

Marquessates in the Peerage of Ireland
Extinct marquessates in the Peerage of Scotland
Noble titles created in 1599
Noble titles created in 1868